Vladimir Bulgak (born 9 May 1941) is a Russian engineer, bureaucrat and politician. He served in different capacities in various cabinets of Russia, including deputy prime minister.

Early life and education
Bulgak was born in Moscow in 1941. He holds a degree in electric communications and later studied at the Institute of Economic Administration.

Career
Bulgak began his career in the Komsomol. He joined the ministry of communications in 1983 and served as bureaucrat there until 1990.

Then he was appointed minister of telecommunications and mass media on 25 July 1990 and served in the post until 17 March 1997. He was the deputy prime minister in Viktor Chernomyrdin's government from 17 March 1997 to 28 April 1998.During his tenure Bulgak was in charge of science, research, production and industry policies. He was appointed minister of science and technology to the cabinet led by Prime Minister Sergey Kiriyenko on 30 April 1998. Bulgak was in office until September 1998.

He was reappointed deputy prime minister for industry and communications to the cabinet of Prime Minister Yevgeny Primakov and served in the post from 16 September 1998 to 25 May 1999. In July 1999, Bulgak was made chairman of the board of Svyazinvest JSC, largest telecommunications holding company in Russia.

References

20th-century Russian engineers
21st-century Russian engineers
1941 births
Communist Party of the Soviet Union members
Deputy heads of government of the Russian Federation
Living people
Government ministers of Russia
Our Home – Russia politicians
Engineers from Moscow
Recipients of the Order "For Merit to the Fatherland", 3rd class
Recipients of the Order of Friendship of Peoples
Recipients of the Order of Honour (Russia)
Recipients of the Order of the Red Banner of Labour
Recipients of the USSR State Prize
State Prize of the Russian Federation laureates
Politicians from Moscow